Jonathan O'Neal Kirksey (born February 21, 1970) is a former professional American football defensive tackle in the National Football League (NFL) and NFL Europe. In his six-year pro career he played for the St. Louis Rams of the NFL and the Amsterdam Admirals of NFL Europe. Kirksey played college football at Bakersfield College and Sacramento State.

Professional career
Kirksey was selected by the New Orleans Saints in the eighth round (221st overall) of the 1993 NFL Draft. He was waived on August 24, 1993.

References

External links
Just Sports Stats

1970 births
Living people
Sportspeople from Greenville, South Carolina
American football defensive tackles
Sacramento State Hornets football players
Amsterdam Admirals players
St. Louis Rams players
Los Angeles Xtreme players